The Hautapu River is a river in the Manawatū-Whanganui region of New Zealand. It originates east of the Ngamatea Swamp in the New Zealand Army's Waiouru Training area. From here it flows south, through private farmland, and in some places following State Highway 1, for several kilometres before entering the Rangitīkei River south of Taihape.

Geography

The river has several waterfalls.

For most of its length the river is closely followed by the North Island Main Trunk and is crossed twice by the railway. The river was diverted in 1905 to avoid the need for a further two railway bridges.

Fishing
The Hautapu is well regarded as a trout fishing stream. In the summer months it can hold relatively good sized brown trout that can be targeted by either dry-fly or nymphing techniques. The river was restocked with brown trout in 1920.

References

Rivers of Manawatū-Whanganui
Rivers of New Zealand